Adépọ̀jù is a surname of Yoruba origin, meaning "the crown or royalty has become ubiquitous".  It also means that you are a king of many kingdoms. The historical Yoruba develop in ṣitu, out of earlier Mesolithic Volta-Niger populations, by the 1st millennium BCE.[59] Oral history recorded under the Oyo Empire derives the Yoruba as an ethnic group from the population of the older kingdom of Ile-Ife. The Yoruba were the dominant cultural force in southern and Northern, Eastern Nigeria as far back as the 11th century.

Notable people with the surname include:
 Mutiu Adepoju (born 1970), Nigerian footballer
 Sikiru Adepoju (born 1950), Nigerian percussionist and recording artist
 Olubukola (Bukky) Taylor Adepoju (born 1977), A Nigerian American writer. Noticeably "The Tale of Growing Up in Two Unique Cultural Worlds Nigerian and America" "Lucy; The Witch" "Letters to My American's Son" 

Yoruba-language surnames